Cindy Burger may refer to:

Cindy Burger (footballer) (born 1980), Dutch footballer
Cindy Burger (tennis) (born 1992), Dutch tennis player